Kerry Tremaine Joseph (born October 4, 1973) is an American former gridiron football quarterback and current coach. He is the assistant quarterbacks coach for the Seattle Seahawks of the National Football League (NFL). He was born in New Iberia, Louisiana.

Joseph was named the CFL's Most Outstanding Player in 2007 while leading the Saskatchewan Roughriders to victory in the 95th Grey Cup. At the end of the season, he had completed 267 of 459 passes for 4002 yards and 24 touchdowns. He also led all quarterbacks in the league in rushing with 737 yards on 90 attempts and 13 touchdowns. On March 5, 2008, the Roughriders traded him to the Argonauts.

College career
In college Joseph played quarterback for McNeese State University, leading his team to a 42–11 record and two Southland Conference titles during four seasons as a starter.

Professional career

NFL
Subsequently, Joseph spent the 1996 season with the Cincinnati Bengals, played for the London Monarchs of the World League in 1997, and tried out as a slotback for the Washington Redskins. In 1998, Joseph played for the Rhein Fire of NFL Europe, where he won the World Bowl Championship. He then was picked up by the Seattle Seahawks where he played safety for four years until being released in 2002.

CFL

Ottawa Renegades

Joseph then headed to Canada to try his luck at finally playing quarterback as a professional. He was acquired as a free agent by the Ottawa Renegades in 2003 and during that season unseated incumbent Dan Crowley for the starting job. In the last game of the 2005 season, a victory over the division-leading Toronto Argonauts, Joseph became only the third (after Damon Allen and Tracy Ham) quarterback in Canadian Football League history to garner over 1000 rushing yards in a single season, finishing with 1006.

Saskatchewan Roughriders
The Renegades suspended operations, but on April 12, 2006, Joseph was selected first overall by Saskatchewan in the Ottawa Renegades dispersal draft.

On November 25, 2007, Joseph won the Grey Cup for the first time in his career, winning 23–19 over the Winnipeg Blue Bombers. On November 29, 2007, he was announced as the first ever CFLPA Pro Player of the Year after fan voting during Grey Cup week.

Toronto Argonauts
Joseph was traded from the Saskatchewan Roughriders to the Toronto Argonauts on March 5, 2008, along with 2010 third round draft pick in exchange for offensive tackle Glenn January, defensive lineman Ronald Flemons, the Argos' 2008 first-round pick and a 2010 second-round selection.

After being traded to the Argos, Joseph struggled with the team, being knocked out of the playoffs for the two seasons that he played there.

On February 21, 2010, Joseph was released by the Argos along with fellow quarterback Cody Pickett and linebacker Zeke Moreno.

Edmonton Eskimos

On October 25, 2010, Joseph was signed by the Edmonton Eskimos to a practice roster agreement after speculation that starting quarterback Ricky Ray would sit out the final two games of the 2010 CFL season.

On December 16, 2010, it was announced that Joseph had been released by the Eskimos.

On January 25, 2011, it was announced that Joseph had been hired as a personal trainer at Cross Gates Athletic Club in Slidell, Louisiana.

June 8, 2011: Signed with the Edmonton Eskimos.

2012 Season: After starting quarterback Steven Jyles went down with an injury, Joseph started 3 games and threw for 1286 yards with 9 touchdowns and 6 interceptions.

On January 28, 2014, Joseph announced his retirement from pro football.

Joseph was the Program Director of Parisi Speed School in Slidell, La after retiring.

Return to Saskatchewan
On October 7, 2014, it announced by the Saskatchewan Roughriders that he was coming out of retirement to return to his former team. Prior to his resigning with the Roughriders, Joseph had been working as a coaching intern with the New Orleans Saints. Joseph made his first start of the season against the Edmonton Eskimos on October 19, 2014. Joseph had been a member of the Eskimos organization until the end of the 2013 season and retired in early 2014. Joseph played in 2 more regular season games for the Roughriders and 1 playoff game. In said playoff game Joseph struggled, throwing 5 interceptions on 17 pass attempts for a passer rating of 45.8.

On December 5, 2014, Joseph announced his retirement from the CFL as a Saskatchewan Roughrider.

In August 2019, Joseph was inducted in the Saskatchewan Roughriders Plaza of Honour.

Coaching career
Joseph returned to McNeese to serve as co-offensive coordinator and coach the wide receivers in 2016.  In 2018, his positional responsibilities shifted from wide receivers to quarterbacks in 2018, maintaining co-offensive coordinator duties as well.  His coaching experience includes a pair of NFL Training Camp internships as well, one with the Saints (2014), and the other with the Buccaneers (2017).

Joseph was named interim head coach at McNeese in November 2018, following the termination of head coach Lance Guidry after a 6–5 campaign.

Joseph joined the Southeastern Louisiana football coaching staff in March 2019 as Running Backs coach/Passing Game Coordinator.

Joseph was named assistant wide receivers coach for the Seattle Seahawks on March 3, 2021.

In 2022 he was made the assistant quarterbacks coach for the Seahawks.

References

External links

 Joseph's official website
 Edmonton Eskimos' bio page
 Saskatchewan Roughriders bio

1973 births
Living people
African-American players of Canadian football
American football quarterbacks
American football safeties
Canadian Football League Most Outstanding Player Award winners
Canadian football quarterbacks
Edmonton Elks players
London Monarchs players
McNeese Cowboys football players
Ottawa Renegades players
People from New Iberia, Louisiana
Rhein Fire players
Seattle Seahawks players
Toronto Argonauts players
People from Slidell, Louisiana
Players of American football from Louisiana
Cincinnati Bengals players
New Orleans Saints coaches
Saskatchewan Roughriders players
Seattle Seahawks coaches
21st-century African-American sportspeople
20th-century African-American sportspeople